This is a list of net idols, someone who achieves celebrity status through the internet.

C 

 Beckii Cruel

D 
 Francesca Dani
 Danceroid

P~Z 
 Venus Angelic

See also
List of Japanese idols

Net idols